Romeo & Julia is the official soundtrack for Terminaator's musical "Romeo & Julia" (Romeo and Juliet), made for Eesti Nuku- ja Noorsooteater (Estonian Puppet and Youth Theatre). Unlike the soundtrack for "Risk", this one wasn't released under the name of Terminaator.

It was written for the Eurovision Song Contest 2007 and was also added in the play and released as a single, but it's absent from the earlier released soundtrack.

Track listing 
 Jaagup Kreem/choir - Rikkad vaesed [Rich people poor people] (E. Liitmaa/J. Kreem) - 3:45
 Kristjan Kasearu, Taavi Tõnisson/choir - Oh armastus [Oh love] (E. Liitmaa/J. Kreem) - 2:49
 Kristjan Kasearu/choir - Pilveräbalad [ Cloudshreds] (E. Liitmaa/J. Kreem) - 3:25
 Hele Kõre - Arm on hukatus (1) [Love is doom] (E. Liitmaa/J. Kreem) - 2:30
 Tõnu Kilgas/choir - Ljubov, amore, love või armastus ["või" means "or", other 4 words are "love" in different languages: Russian, Italian, English and Estonian] (E. Liitmaa/J. Kreem) - 3:10
 Kristjan Kasearu/choir - Nagu esimene kord [Like on the first time] (E. Liitmaa/J. Kreem) - 2:55
 Hele Kõre, Kristjan Kasearu - Siis, kui maailm magab veel [When the world is still sleeping] (E. Liitmaa/J. Kreem) - 4:41
 Kaire Vilgats, Jaagup Kreem, Taavi Tõnisson/choir - Külakoerad [ Village dogs] (E. Liitmaa/J. Kreem) - 1:42
 Kaire Vilgats - Mõrkjad pisarad [Bitter tears] (E. Liitmaa/J. Kreem) - 3:09
 Jaagup Kreem, Kristjan Kasearu - Sõbrad nii ei tee [ Friends don't do that] (J. Kreem) - 2:24
 Tõnis Mägi - Tee seda veel [Do that again] (E. Liitmaa/J. Kreem) - 3:52
 Liisi Koikson - Arm on hukatus (2) (E. Liitmaa/J. Kreem) - 2:19
 Jaagup Kreem/choir - Pankuri tütar ja töölise poeg [Banker's daughter and laborer's son] (E. Liitmaa/J. Kreem) - 5:08
 Kristjan Kasearu/choir - "Head ööd [Good night] (E. Liitmaa/J. Kreem) - 4:21
 Kaire Vilgats, Jaagup Kreem/choir - Surmav vaen [Deadly dander] (E. Liitmaa/J. Kreem) - 3:49
 Kaire Vilgats - Tee seda vee - 2:56

Song information 
 Tracks 4 & 12 are different versions of one song, also with different artists.
 Tracks 11 & 16 have the same lyrics but are performed by different artists.
 Tracks  6, 13 & 14 are also found on Terminaator's album "Nagu esimene kord" (there performed by Terminaator).

Choir
Andres Dvinjaninov (1, 15)
Rasmus Erismaa (1, 3, 6, 8, 15)
Jelena Juzvik (15)
Harmo Kallaste (13)
 (1, 3, 6)
Henno Kelp (13)
Jaagup Kreem (13)
Hele Kõre (2, 15)
Elmar Liitmaa (13, 14)
Anneli Pilpak (8, 15)
Mart-Rasmus Puur (8, 15)
Kristo Rajasaare (8)
Taavi Tõnisson (1, 3, 6, 15)
Kaire Vilgats (1, 2, 3, 5, 6)
Taavi Üprus (8)

Singles
 2006: Pilveräbalad
 2006: Siis, kui maailm magab veel
 2006: Head ööd

References

Terminaator albums
2006 soundtrack albums
Theatre soundtracks
Estonian-language albums